The battle of Kawasaki was the first major battle of the Early Nine Years' War (Zenkunen War) (1051-1063). It was fought between the forces of the Abe clan, led by Abe no Sadato, and those of the Minamoto clan, acting as agents of the Imperial Court, and led by Minamoto no Yoriyoshi and his eighteen-year-old son Yoshiie.

History 
Much of the battle took place during a snowstorm, and consisted of Minamoto assaults on Abe no Sadato's entrenched army of 4000 warriors. In the end, the Minamoto were driven off, due to a combination of Abe resistance and the weather, and were pursued through the blizzard by Sadato and his men.  "In the end only six officers on horseback were left.  These were Yoshiie, Junior Secretary of Palace Repairs Fujiwara no Kagemichi, Oyake no Mitsuto, Kiyohara no Sadahiro, Fujiwara no Norisue and Noriakira."

The Mutsu Waki states, "The 200 horse-riding rebels half-circled and attacked them from the solid left and right wings, shooting arrows like rain.  But Yoshiie kept shooting down enemy commanders.  Finally, the rebels, deciding that these men were gods, retreated, so Yoriyoshi's men were also able to retreat."

References

Turnbull, Stephen (1998). 'The Samurai Sourcebook'. London: Cassell & Co.

Kawasaki
Kawasaki
1057 in Asia
1050s in Japan

ja:前九年の役#黄海の戦い